Antisolarium egenum is a small sea snail, a marine gastropod mollusc in the family Trochidae, the top shells.

Description
The size of the shell varies between 4 mm and 7.5 mm. The thin, minute shell has a low ovate-conic shape and is amply umbilicated. Its color is ashy white, pearly beneath. The six whorls are convex. The body whorl is obtusely angular. Each whorl is encircled by four sharply-compressed well-elevated ribs, the two uppermost of which are beaded. The interspaces are concave, smooth, with a single groove near the margin of the umbilicus. The latter occupies ⅓ of the base, is tunnel-shaped and penetrates to the apex. Its sides are excavated on each whorl, the verge of which is crenulated. The aperture is nearly circular, slightly encroached upon by the inflection of the columella. Its interior is pearly. The lip simple.

Distribution
This marine species is endemic to New Zealand.

References

 Powell A. W. B., New Zealand Mollusca, William Collins Publishers Ltd, Auckland, New Zealand 1979 
 Herbert D.G. (1992). Revision of the Umboniinae (Mollusca: Prosobranchia: Trochidae) in southern Africa and Mozambique. Annals of the Natal Museum 33(2):379-459.

External links
 

egenum
Gastropods of New Zealand
Gastropods described in 1849